The Ashanti–Akim–Akwapim War, also known as the Ashanti Invasion of the Gold Coast, was the expansion of West African Empire of Ashanti against the alliance of Akyem and Akuapem tribes from 1814 until 1816 for access to the coast. This battle was not a direct war on Akyem states, which were never subdued by any power, but a war to get access to the coasts in which the Akyem along with Akuapem forces allied for. 

In 1814 the Ashanti, under the leadership of Asantehene Osei Bonsu, defeated the outnumbered Akim-Akwapim alliance. 

After the war and with access to the coast the Ashanti followed up their victory by pillaging the coastal Ga people.

See also
Empire of Ashanti
Ashanti-Fante War
Ga-Fante War 
Anglo-Asante Wars 
History of Ghana

External links
Sanderson Beck: Asante, British and the Gold Coast

History of Ghana
Wars involving the Ashanti Empire
Conflicts in 1814
Conflicts in 1815
Conflicts in 1816 
1814 in Africa
1815 in Africa
1816 in Africa